Bury is a market town on the River Irwell in the Metropolitan Borough of Bury, Greater Manchester, England. which had an estimated  population of 78,723 in 2015.

The town is within the historic county boundaries of Lancashire. It emerged in the Industrial Revolution as a mill town manufacturing textiles. The town is known for the open-air Bury Market and black pudding, the traditional local dish.

Sir Robert Peel was born in the town. Peel was a Prime Minister of the United Kingdom who founded the Metropolitan Police and the Conservative Party. A memorial and monument for Peel, the former stands outside Bury parish church and the latter overlooks the borough on Holcombe Hill.

History

Toponymy
The name Bury (also earlier known as Buri and Byri) comes from an Old English word, meaning castle, stronghold or fort, an early form of modern English borough (German burg).

Early history
Bury was formed around the ancient market place but there is evidence of activity dating back to the period of Roman occupation. Bury Museum has a Roman urn containing a number of small bronze coins dated for AD 253–282 and found north of what is now the town centre. Under Agricola the road–building programme included a route from the fort at Manchester (Mamucium) to the fort at Ribchester (Bremetennacum) which ran through Radcliffe and Affetside. The modern Watling Street, which serves the Seddons Farm estate on the west side of town, follows the approximate line of the Roman road.

The most imposing building in the early town would have been Bury Castle, a medieval manor house built in 1469 for Sir Thomas Pilkington. It sat in a good defensive position on high ground overlooking the Irwell Valley. The Pilkington family suffered badly in the Wars of the Roses when, despite geography, they supported the House of York.  When Richard III was killed at the Battle of Bosworth in 1485, Thomas Pilkington was captured and later executed. The outcome of the battle was the Lancastrian Duke of Richmond being crowned Henry VII by Sir William Stanley. As a reward for the support of his family, Thomas Stanley was created Earl of Derby and, amongst other lands, the confiscated Pilkington estate in Bury was presented to him.

The ancestral home of the Earls of Derby is Knowsley Hall on the outskirts of Liverpool. The family maintains a connection with Bury in various ways—the Derby High School is named after them. When the school opened in 1959 the 18th Earl of Derby was patron and the school's badge is based on the Earl's coat of arms. The 15th and 16th Earls were both supporters of Bury Grammar School, both financially and in terms of land, and one of the school houses is named Derby in their honour. The town was formerly home to the Derby Hall and the Derby Hotel.

The castle remains were buried beneath the streets outside the Castle Armoury until properly excavated for the first time in the 1970s.

Between 1801 and 1830, the population of the town more than doubled from 7,072 to 15,086. This was the time when the factories, mines and foundries, with their spinning machines and steam engines, began to dominate the landscape. In 1822 Bury Savings Bank opened on Silver Street established under government control and later became TSB.

Industrial Revolution
Probate evidence from the 17th century and the remains of 18th century weavers' cottages in Elton, on the west side of Bury, indicate that domestic textile production was an important factor in the local economy at a time when Bury's textile industry was dominated by woollens, and based upon the domestic production of yarn and cloth, as well as water-powered fulling mills.

Development was swift in the late 18th and early 19th centuries. The establishment in 1773 by the family of Sir Robert Peel of Brooksbottom Mill in Summerseat, north of the town, as a calico printing works marked the beginning of the cotton industry in Bury. By the early 19th century, cotton was the predominant textile industry, with the Rivers Roch and Irwell providing power for spinning mills and processing water for the finishing trades. Development was further promoted when the town was linked to the national canal network by the Manchester, Bolton & Bury Canal, fully opened in 1808. The canal was provided with water from Elton Reservoir, fed by aqueducts from a weir on the Irwell, north of what is now the Burrs Country Park. The Burrs is also the site of another mill developed by the Peel family, first founded in 1790. The remains are displayed for the public. There were seven cotton mills in Bury by 1818 and the population grew from 9,152 in 1801, to 20,710 in 1841, and then to 58,029 in 1901.

Following this, railways were opened, linking the town from Bury Bolton Street railway station to Manchester (via Prestwich and Radcliffe), to Rawtenstall and to Accrington. From the Knowsley Street railway station there were connections to the neighbouring mill towns of Bolton, Heywood and Rochdale. As well as the many cotton mills, other industries which thrived included paper–making, calico printing and some light engineering. The town expanded to incorporate the former townships of Elton, Walmersley and Heap, and rows of terraced houses encircled the town centre by the turn of the 19th century. Districts such as Freetown, Fishpool and Pimhole were transformed from farmers' fields to rows of terraces beside the factories and mills.

The houses were of the most limited kind, without basic facilities, sewers or proper streets. The result was the rapid spread of disease and high mortality rates in crowded areas. In 1838, out of 1,058 working class houses in Bury investigated by the Manchester Statistical Society, 733 had 3–4 people in each bed, 207 had 4–5, and 76 had 5–6. Social reformers locally and nationally were concerned about such issues, including Edwin Chadwick. One report that prepared the ground for the reform of public health matters, commissioned by the then Prime Minister, Sir Robert Peel, asked local doctors for information. King Street, Bury, was highlighted: it had 10 houses, each with one bedroom, and a population of 69. The average age of death in Bury was 13.8 years. Towns like Bury were likened to 'camps' where newcomers sought work in mill, mine or forge. Many, often from Ireland, found shelter in lodging houses. 38 in Bury were surveyed. 73% had men and women sharing beds indiscriminately, 81% were filthy and the average was 5.5 persons to a bed.

Although Bury had few of the classic late 19th century spinning mills that were such a feature of other Lancashire towns, a group known as Peel Mills are still in use at Castlecroft Road. Immediately north of the town centre, their name is another reminder of the link with the Peel family.

Lancashire Fusiliers

According to writer Geoffrey Moorhouse, no history of Bury is complete without reference to its role as the regimental town of the Lancashire Fusiliers.

In 1688, Prince William of Orange (later King William III) landed at Brixham, Devon. He asked Colonel Sir Robert Peyton to raise a regiment containing six independent companies in the Exeter area. This regiment absorbed the previously enscripted men housed at the Wellington Barracks, who would have been any men over the age of 21. These men became the Lancashire Fusiliers once they joined William's of Orange Men. Following successful recruitment, a regimental depot was established at Wellington Barracks in 1881. This barracks were originally built as a response to the Chartist movement, who were a mass movement of working-class men who protested via petition signatures.

The People's Charter called for six reforms to make the political system more democratic:

 A vote for every man aged twenty-one years and above, of sound mind, and not undergoing punishment for a crime.
     The secret ballot to protect the elector in the exercise of his vote.
     No property qualification for Members of Parliament to allow the constituencies to return the man of their choice.
     Payment of Members, enabling tradesmen, working men, or other persons of modest means to leave or interrupt their livelihood to attend to the interests of the nation.
    Equal constituencies, securing the same amount of representation for the same number of electors, instead of allowing less populous constituencies to have as much or more weight than larger ones.
    Annual Parliamentary elections, thus presenting the most effectual check to bribery and intimidation, since no purse could buy a constituency under a system of universal manhood suffrage in every twelve months.

Chartists saw themselves fighting against political corruption and for democracy in an industrial society, but attracted support beyond the radical political groups for economic reasons, such as opposing wage cuts and unemployment.

Recent history

The post-war period saw a major decline in the cotton industry and, as with many neighbouring towns, Bury's skyline was soon very different, with countless factory chimneys being pulled down and the associated mills closing their doors permanently. The old shopping area around Princess Street and Union Square was demolished in the late 1960s, and a concrete precinct was built to replace it. This development was replaced by the Mill Gate Shopping Centre in 1995.

On 23 November 1981, an F0/T1 tornado formed over Whitefield and subsequently moved through Bury town centre and surrounding areas.

In 2010 a £350m shopping development opened up around the Rock. The main street is populated mainly by independent shops and food outlets. At the top end of the street is a shopping area with a multi-screen cinema, bowling alley, and department stores including Marks & Spencer, Primark, H&M, Boots, Clarks, Poundland, Body Shop and Warren James Jewellers.

Bury also benefited from other facilities in the early 2010s including a new medical centre and office accommodation close to Bury Town Hall. A decision by Marks and Spencer to vacate its store in the Mill Gate Shopping Centre and move into a new larger one on The Rock emphasised a change of clientele in the town.

The town centre is famous for its traditional market, with its "world famous" black pudding stalls. Bury Market was also once famous for its tripe, although this has declined in recent decades. The Bury Black Pudding Company, owned by the Chadwick family, provides black pudding to retailers such as Harrods, and to major supermarkets, and the market is a destination for people from all over Greater Manchester and beyond. The last 30 years have seen the town develop into an important commuter town for neighbouring Manchester. Large-scale housing development has taken place around Unsworth, Redvales, Sunnybank, Brandlesholme, Limefield, Chesham and Elton. The old railway line to Manchester Victoria closed in 1990 and was replaced by the light rapid transit system Metrolink in 1992. The town was also linked to the motorway network with the opening of the M66, accessed from the east side of the town, in 1978.

Governance

The town was initially a parish, then a select vestry with a "board of guardians for the poor". Improvement commissioners were added before the borough charter was granted in 1876. In 1889, the town's status was raised to that of a county borough of Lancashire.

The coat of arms was granted in 1877 and its symbols represent local industry. In the quarters are representations of the anvil (for forging), the golden fleece (the wool industry), a pair of crossed shuttles (the cotton industry) and a papyrus plant (the paper industry). Above them are a closed visor capped by a mayfly and two red roses. The Latin motto "Vincit Omnia Industria" translates as "work conquers all".

With the passage of the Local Government Act 1972, Bury merged with the neighbouring municipal boroughs of Radcliffe and Prestwich, together with the urban districts of Whitefield, Tottington and Ramsbottom in 1974 to become the Metropolitan Borough of Bury. The borough is part of the metropolitan county of Greater Manchester.

On 3 July 2008, a referendum was held in the borough to decide whether it should be ruled by a directly elected mayor. The proposal was rejected by the voters.

Geography

Bury is located on the edge of the western Pennines in North West England, in the northern part of the Greater Manchester Urban Area. Its position on the River Irwell has proved important in its history and development.  Flowing from north to south, the river divides the town into two parts on the east and west sides of the valley respectively. The town centre sits close to, and above, the river on the east side.  Bury Bridge is a key bridging point, linking the east side of town and the town centre with the western suburbs and Bolton beyond.  Other bridges across the river are few—there is one at Radcliffe Road to the south and one at Summerseat to the north.  There is a bridge at the Burrs, but it serves a cul-de-sac and does not allow full east–west access. To the south, the main tributary (the River Roch, flowing from the east) joins the Irwell close to another significant bridging point, Blackford Bridge.  This carries the main road south (the A56) towards Manchester.

Bury experiences a warm temperate climate with warm summers and cool winters owing to the shielding effect of the Western Pennine Moors. Summer is the driest time of the year with low rainfall. In summer, the temperature is warm and Bury experiences much sun. Winters are cool; temperatures can drop below freezing between December and March. There is not much extreme weather in Bury; floods are rare since the town is on higher ground, although flood is occasionally seen in Ramsbottom. Early summer thunderstorms bring high rainfall.

For purposes of the Office for National Statistics, Bury is part of the Greater Manchester Urban Area.

Demography
At the 2001 census the town of Bury had a total population of 77,211, whereas the wider Metropolitan Borough had a population of 183,200.

Landmarks

Attractions in Bury include:

 Bury Art Museum, containing the Wrigley collection of paintings, which includes works by J. M. W. Turner, Edwin Henry Landseer, John Constable and Peter De Wint. The building, by Woodhouse and Willoughby in 1899, was described by Pevsner as "probably the best building in Bury."
 Bury Castle is a fortified manor house built in the mid 13th century by Sir Thomas Pilkington and is now protected as a Scheduled Ancient Monument; the foundations have been excavated and have been open to the public since 2000.
 Bury Parish Church, on the Market Place in the centre of the town, is a Grade I listed building.
 Bury's 'World Famous' Market has been in operation for nearly 600 years; the original licence for a market was granted in 1444. In 2006, of 1,150 markets in the UK, Bury Market was voted the best 'British Market of the Year' by the National Association of British Market Authorities. The market was also selected as BBC Radio 4's Food and Farming Awards Market of the Year in 2008. It receives over 1,000 coachloads of visitors every year.
 Castlesteads is an ancient promontory fort and scheduled monument.
 Peel Tower, Harcles Hill, above Holcombe village, Ramsbottom. The tower was built in remembrance of Sir Robert Peel, Prime Minister of the United Kingdom and founder of the Metropolitan Police, who was born in Bury and was responsible for the Repeal of the Corn Laws in 1846. Hundreds of people climb to the tower each year on Good Friday. Historically this gathering had a principally religious purpose, since the hill was said to be strikingly similar to the hill that Jesus climbed (Calvary) before his crucifixion on Good Friday.

 Whitehead Clock Tower stands in Whitehead Garden, separated from the Town Hall by a railway cutting. It was erected in 1913 as a memorial to Walter Whitehead, a surgeon of international repute who was born in the town.
 East Lancashire Railway, a heritage railway which runs from the town to Heywood, Ramsbottom and Rawtenstall. Based at Bury Bolton Street railway station.
 The Fusilier Museum, a regimental museum of the Lancashire Fusiliers on Moss Street in Bury.
 Manchester Road, Silver Street and environs contain many examples of Late Georgian brick terrace and York stone housing.

Bury is home to several fine sculptures and pieces of public art. Edward Hodges Baily's 1851 statue of Sir Robert Peel stands in the centre of town, while Lutyens' Lancashire Fusiliers War Memorial can be found outside the Fusilier Museum. George Frampton's 'cheering fusilier', a tribute to those who died in the Boer War, stands in Whitehead Garden near the town hall. The Kay Monument, a solid pavilion with a stone dome capped with a bronze Fame, commemorates John Kay, the inventor of the flying shuttle which revolutionised the weaving industry. Designed by William Venn Gough in 1908, it holds a number of sculpted bronze plaques by John Cassidy. Contemporary works include Ron Silliman's text piece From Northern Soul (Bury Neon) at Bury Interchange.

Transport

Bury is connected to other settlements via bus services, Metrolink and the heritage railway.

Between 1903 and 1949, the Bury Corporation Tramways network served the town.

Bury Bolton Street railway station, first opened in 1846 and substantially rebuilt in the 1880s and again in the 1950s, is now home to the East Lancashire Railway, a heritage railway which serves Heywood, Ramsbottom and Rawtenstall but does not provide a regular commuter service. The station is the original railway station of Bury and was a mainline station until 1980, although after December 1966 passenger services were reduced to a commuter service to Manchester only (formerly there were services to Ramsbottom, Rawtenstall and Bacup to the north of Bury also from Bolton Street station).

Bury was served by two major railway stations between 1848 and 1970, when Bury Knowsley Street railway station was closed. Bury Knowsley Street station had passenger services travelling east–west through Bury, connecting the town directly to both Bolton and Heywood. After October 1970 services to and from Manchester were the only passenger rail services connecting Bury to the national rail network. Bury to Manchester Victoria rail services were provided by Class 504 units, which were third-rail operated, in the 1970s and 1980s. Bury Interchange opened in March 1980 close to the site of the former Knowsley Street station (which was demolished in the early-1970s). It was the replacement for the Bolton Street railway station (which was subsequently taken over the East Lancashire Railway heritage line in 1987), and initially incorporated a railway station, with services to Manchester Victoria, and a bus station. Third-rail powered heavy rail passenger services integrated with the national rail network ceased in 1991, with Metrolink taking over the line and trams operating the line since April 1992. As a result, Bury has not had a conventional heavy rail link to the national network since 1991.

Diamond North West and Rosso operate most bus services around Bury, connecting with destinations within Greater Manchester, Rossendale, Accrington and Burnley. The bus station is connected to the Bury Interchange Metrolink tram stop, to provide a vast complex of inter-modal transport. There is also a free car park at the rear of the complex and a cycle hub for parking bikes during the day. The station is located in the centre of Bury, close to Bury Market, the Millgate Shopping Centre, the Rock and the main square.

There is generally a service every 6 minutes from Bury to Manchester city centre, with every other tram continuing to Altrincham.

Education

Colleges
 Bury College, formed from a merger of Bury Technical College, Peel Sixth Form College and Stand Sixth Form College.
 Bury Grammar School has existed since 1570.
 Bury Grammar School (Girls), formerly Bury Girls' High School, opened in 1884.
 Holy Cross College, formerly Bury Convent Grammar School. (In 2008, Holy Cross College was named the second best college in the country in relation to students' academic performance.)

High schools located in the town include
Broad Oak High School
Bury Church of England High School
Bury Grammar School (Independent)
Bury Grammar School (Girls) (Independent)
Derby High School
Elton High School
St Gabriel's RC High School
Tottington High School
Woodhey High School

Sport
Bury F.C. was the town's local football club. Bury played in League One, the third tier of English football, when it was expelled from the Football League in August 2019 due to unpaid debts and poor ownership.

The Lancashire Spinners are a basketball team based in Bury. They compete in the second tier English Basketball League Division 1, and have done so since promotion from Division 2 in 2015. The club have close ties with nearby Myerscough College.

Bury Broncos are a Rugby League team based in the Prestwich area. Formed in 2008, they play in the North West Men's League and will compete in Division 1 in the 2021 season.

Culture

Performing arts
The Met arts centre, based in the Derby Hall on Market Street, is a small performing arts venue promoting a programme of theatre, music and comedy events. The Met has hosted famous comedy acts such as Peter Kay, Jason Manford, Steve Coogan and Eddie Izzard in their days before fame.

Museums and galleries
Bury Art Museum is home to a fine collection of Victorian and 20th-century art, including works by Turner, Constable, and Landseer.

The Fusilier Museum, home to the collection of the Lancashire Fusiliers, commemorates over three hundred years of the regiment's history. The museum occupies the former School of Arts and Crafts on Broad Street.

The Bury Transport Museum, part of the East Lancashire Railway, holds a collection of vintage vehicles and interactive displays.  It is housed in the restored and Grade II-listed 1848 Castlecroft Goods Shed.

Music
The 2008 Mercury Music Prize winning group Elbow, fronted by Guy Garvey, hails from Bury. In 2009, the group was awarded the Freedom of the Borough after their 2008 album The Seldom Seen Kid won several accolades including a Brit Award and the Mercury Prize.

Bury hosts several music festivals yearly, including the Glaston-Bury Festival on the August bank holiday weekend, and Head for the Hills Festival (previously known as Ramsbottom Festival) closing the festival season in mid-September. While Glaston-Bury hosts mainly local/upcoming bands, Head for the Hills hosts a wider range of talent, including bands such as Soul II Soul, The Proclaimers and Maxïmo Park. The festival also has a popular silent disco, where DJs battle for the larger audience. For the past two years, this battle has largely been dominated by the DJ team BABs, a brother and sister partnership from the local village of Edenfield.

Food
Bury is known for its black puddings so much so, that it is not uncommon to see it marketed as "Bury Black Pudding" on a menu. Bury simnel cake is a variant of the cake originating in Bury. The town was also notable for tripe, though there is little demand for this in modern times.

Notable people

 John Kay (1704–c.1779), the inventor of the flying shuttle, one of the key inventions of the Industrial Revolution. He was born to a yeoman farming family at Park, a hamlet just north of Bury, on 16 June 1704. A memorial to John Kay stands in the heart of Bury in Kay Gardens. He also features as one of twelve subjects of the Manchester Murals by Ford Madox Brown which decorate the Great Hall of Manchester Town Hall and depict the history of the city. The piece shows Kay being smuggled to safety as rioters, who feared their jobs were in danger, sought to destroy looms whose invention he had made possible. This was a key moment in the struggle between labour and new technology. He eventually fled to France and died in poverty.
 James Wood, mathematician, Dean of Ely and Master of St John's College, Cambridge, was born at Holcombe, Bury, in 1760. A pupil at Bury Grammar School, he won an exhibition to St John's College and was a college tutor from 1789 to 1814. During this time he published The Principles of Mathematics and Natural Philosophy. He was appointed Dean of Ely in 1820. He served as Master of St John's from 1815 and left his library to the college upon his death in 1839.
 Sir Robert Peel (1788–1850), the 19th century Prime Minister of the United Kingdom best known today for the repeal of the Corn Laws and his introduction of the modern police force (hence the terms "Bobbies" and "Peelers"), was born in Bury. He is also notable for forming the famous British Police division, 'Scotland Yard' in London. A monument, Peel Tower, now exists to his memory. As this is situated nearly 1,000 feet above sea level, it is easily recognisable for miles around. The tower itself was not built for Sir Robert, but to provide work for local workers and was later dedicated to him. A statue of Peel stands in Market Place, outside the Robert Peel public house. The statue of Sir Robert has his waistcoat fastening the wrong way round.
 Professor Sir John Charnley, born the son of a Bury pharmacist in 1911. He wrote The Closed Treatment of Common Fractures, first published in 1950, which became a standard text for the subject. His subsequent achievement in developing hip replacement surgery, in 1962, is acknowledged as a ground breaking development that changed the approach to orthopaedic surgery. He established a centre for hip surgery at Wrightington Hospital, near Wigan where he worked. He was knighted for his work in 1977. The John Charnley Research Institute at Wrightington Hospital near Wigan, was named in his honour.
Andrew Higginson, businessman and chairman of Wm Morrison Supermarkets Plc.
 Cherie Blair, barrister and wife of former Prime Minister Tony Blair.

Sport 
 Nicky Ajose, former Charlton Athletic footballer and coach at Exeter City F.C.
 Andy Goram, Scottish international footballer.
 James Guy, Olympic gold medal swimmer in the 2020 Summer Olympics in Tokyo.
 Barrie Kelly, sprinter who competed in the 1968 Summer Olympics in Mexico City, and the 1966 and 1970 Commonwealth Games in Jamaica and Edinburgh.
 Gary Neville, former Manchester United F.C. captain.
 Phil Neville, former Everton F.C. midfielder and captain, and younger brother of Gary Neville.
 Tracey Neville, netball international and younger sister of Gary and Phil Neville.
 Gareth Parry (Gaz), one of Britain's most successful rock climbers. A former British champion in 1996 and 2002, he became British bouldering team coach.
 Scott Quigg, the current British super-bantamweight boxing champion and WBA Interim World Champion.
 Lawrie Smith, yachtsman. He learnt to sail at Elton Sailing Club, Bury, and won a bronze medal at the Barcelona Olympics in 1992, and the Fastnet Race.
 Callum Styles, footballer for Millwall and Hungary international.
 Kieran Trippier, footballer for Newcastle United and England international.
 Adam Yates, professional cyclist and twin brother of Simon Yates.
 Simon Yates, professional cyclist and twin brother of Adam Yates.
 Rico Lewis, footballer for Manchester City.

Writers 
 Richmal Crompton, author, was born on Manchester Road, Bury; a blue plaque marks the house. Her father, Rev. Edward John Sewell Lamburn, taught Classics at Bury Grammar School.
 Thomas Thompson, writer (1880–1951), author and broadcaster, born in Bury and lived there for his whole life.

Actors 

 Gemma Atkinson, actress and model.
 Antony Cotton, actor and television host best known as Sean Tully in Coronation Street.
 Helen Flanagan, actress best known as Rosie Webster in Coronation Street.
 Steve Halliwell, actor best known as Zak Dingle in Emmerdale.
 Matt Littler, actor best known as Max Cunningham in Hollyoaks, was a pupil of Elton High School.
 Jamie Lomas, actor best known as Warren Fox in Hollyoaks. He is the brother of Charley Webb.
 Charley Webb, actress best known for playing Debbie Dingle in Emmerdale. She is the sister of Jamie Lomas.
 Jennie McAlpine, actress best known as Fiz in Coronation Street, was a pupil of St Gabriel's Roman Catholic High School, Bury
 Christian McKay, actor. He studied piano as a youth and had performed the Rachmaninoff Piano Concerto No. 3 in concert at the age of 21. He played Orson Welles in the film Me and Orson Welles.
 Nigel Pilkington, actor, writer, and voice actor.
 Lisa Riley, actress and television presenter best known as Mandy Dingle in Emmerdale
 Suzanne Shaw, originally famous for winning the show Popstars and being a member of Hear'say. Shaw became the star of West End shows as well as a singer, actress and television presenter.
 Ralf Little, actor, best known for playing Antony Royle in The Royle Family and Johnny Keogh in Two Pints of Lager and a Packet of Crisps.
 Victoria Wood, comedian, composer and actor. Although from nearby Prestwich, Bury has the honour of hosting a statue of the celebrated comedian and writer, which stands opposite Bury's central library.

Music 
 Guy Garvey, the lead singer of alternative rock band Elbow.
 John Howard, singer-songwriter.
 Christian Savill, guitarist with Slowdive.
 Peter Skellern, singer-songwriter and pianist.
 Ian Wallace, rock drummer with King Crimson, Don Henley, Bob Dylan and others, attended Bury Grammar School.
 David Whittaker, video game composer.

Members of Parliament
 Sir David Trippier (born 1945), former Member of Parliament (MP) for Rossendale and Darwen. Educated at Bury Grammar School.
 David Crausby (born 1946), MP for Bolton North East was born in Bury. Educated at the Derby High School.
 David Chaytor (born 1949), former MP for Bury North was born in Bury. Educated at Bury Grammar School.
 Alistair Burt (born 1955), former MP 2001–2019 for North East Bedfordshire was born in Bury and was School Captain of Bury Grammar School. Prior to losing his seat to David Chaytor in 1997 he represented his hometown as MP for Bury North from 1983.

Twin towns
Bury is twinned with:
 Angoulême, a town and commune in South-West France, after which the Angoulême retail park is named.
 Tulle, a small town in the Corrèze department of France.  Originally twinned with Prestwich.
 Schorndorf, a medieval German market town and birthplace of Gottlieb Daimler. It lies to the east of Stuttgart, capital of Baden-Württemberg, Germany.
 Woodbury, New Jersey, United States.
 Datong, China.

See also

Listed buildings in Bury
Healthcare in Greater Manchester
Bury power station

References

Sources
Town Population figure
Bury Savings Bank

Further reading

External links

 Bury Metropolitan Borough Council
 Bury Districts
 Bury and District Local History Society
 Bury Archives Online

 
Towns in Greater Manchester
Market towns in Greater Manchester
Unparished areas in Greater Manchester
Geography of the Metropolitan Borough of Bury